Megachile biseta is a species of bee in the family Megachilidae. It was described by Vachal in 1903.

References

Biseta
Insects described in 1903